Elbursia is a genus of moths of the family Crambidae. It contains only one species, Elbursia stocki, which is found in the Alborz Mountains in Iran.

References

Spilomelinae
Taxa named by Hans Georg Amsel
Monotypic moth genera
Crambidae genera